Pool A of the 2014 Fed Cup Asia/Oceania Group I was one of two pools in the Asia/Oceania Group I of the 2014 Fed Cup. Three teams competed in a round robin competition, with the top team and the bottom two teams proceeding to their respective sections of the play-offs: the top team played for advancement to the World Group II Play-offs, while the bottom team faced potential relegation to Group II.

Standings

Round-robin

Indonesia vs. Thailand

Kazakhstan vs. Indonesia

Kazakhstan vs. Thailand

References

External links 
 Fed Cup website

A1